Woman's Island may refer to:

 Upernavik Island, Greenland, formerly also known as Women's or Woman's Island
 Old Woman's Island or Little Colaba, a former island in Mumbai, India
 Kunoy (Faroese: "Woman's Island") in the Faroe Islands